Statistics of the 1995–96 Saudi First Division.

Relegation play-offs
Al-Ansar, who finished 2nd, faced Hajer, who finished 3rd for a two-legged play-off.

First leg

External links 
 Saudi Arabia Football Federation
 Saudi League Statistics

Saudi First Division League seasons
Saudi Professional League
2